West Branch Run (also known as West Branch Little Fishing Creek ) is a tributary of Little Fishing Creek in Lycoming County and Columbia County, in Pennsylvania, in the United States. The stream's only named tributary is Shingle Run. West Branch Run flows through a valley known as California Hollow, which is listed as a "locally significant site" on the Columbia County Natural Areas Inventory. The Shoemaker Covered Bridge also crosses the stream, as does at least one other bridge in Lycoming County.

Course

West Branch Run begins in Jordan Township, Lycoming County and flows southwest for more than a mile. It then turns south-southwest and flows for slightly over a mile until it exits Jordan Township. Upon leaving Jordan Township, the stream enters Pine Township. Here, it turns southwest for a short distance before turning southeast near Pine Summit. The stream then flows through a fairly narrow valley known as California Hollow for some distance. At the end of the valley, it receives Shingle Run, its only named tributary, and abruptly turns south. After more than a mile, West Branch Run passes the Shoemaker Covered Bridge, crossing Pennsylvania Route 442 on the way, and turns southeast. It then crosses Pennsylvania Route 442 again and shortly afterwards reaches its confluence with Little Fishing Creek.

Tributaries
The only named tributary of West Branch Run is Shingle Run.

Hydrology, geography and geology

West Branch Run flows through a valley known as California Hollow in Pine Township, Columbia County.

West Branch Run has high levels of dissolved oxygen.

Watershed
There are no roads along West Branch Run where it flows through California Hollow. The stream is one of only a few streams in Columbia County with this property.

The Shoemaker Covered Bridge was built over West Branch Run in 1884 by T.S. Christian. It was rehabilitated in 2008. A bridge carrying the road T-720 was built over the stream in 1936.

Biology
California Hollow, which West Branch Run flows through, is listed as a "locally significant site" on the Columbia County Natural Areas Inventory.

Hemlock and white pine inhabit the slopes of California Hollow. According to the Columbia County Natural Areas Inventory, it may have a high level of diversity among native plants and few invasive plants.

Trout reproduce naturally in West Branch Run.

See also
Spruce Run (Little Fishing Creek), next tributary of Little Fishing Creek going downstream
Lick Run (Little Fishing Creek), next tributary of Little Fishing Creek going upstream
List of tributaries of Fishing Creek (North Branch Susquehanna River)

References

External links

Rivers of Lycoming County, Pennsylvania
Rivers of Columbia County, Pennsylvania
Tributaries of Fishing Creek (North Branch Susquehanna River)
Rivers of Pennsylvania